Victor L. Bailey is a former professional American football player who played wide receiver for three seasons for the Philadelphia Eagles and Kansas City Chiefs.  As a rookie in 1993, he recorded 41 catches for 545 yards and 3 touchdowns. He followed that year up with 20 catches for 311 yards and 1 touchdown in 1994.

He is currently living with his wife Tonja Buford-Bailey and his two kids- Victoria and Victor Bailey Jr.

References

1970 births
Living people
American football wide receivers
Players of American football from Fort Worth, Texas
Missouri Tigers football players
Philadelphia Eagles players
Kansas City Chiefs players